Robert Ober (died December 7, 1950) was an American stage and silent-screen actor.

Early life
Robert Ober attended Divoll grade school in St. Louis, Missouri. He graduated from Washington University in St. Louis.

Career
Ober started his theater career in St. Louis, Missouri at the Century Theatre. His first stage appearance was with the Colonel Hopkins Stock Company in the play In Mizzoura. He also played in My Friend from India and Arizona. He went on tour in the production of Madame X. He then performed with the Harry Davis Company in Pittsburgh, Pennsylvania, and then moved to New York City.

Ober appeared in The Little Gray Lady, Gallops, Brewster's Millions and Ready Money. He appeared with Fay Templeton in Forty-five Minutes from Broadway. He also appeared with Arnold Daly in You Can Never Tell and, in 1917, with Madge Kennedy in Fair and Warmer. He also appeared in You Can't Take It With You. He appeared in Maude Fulton's play The Humming Bird. He also appeared in early motion pictures.

Filmography
Ober acted in the following films:
Introduce Me (1925)
Time, the Comedian (1925)
Souls for Sables (1925)
The Big Parade (1925)
The Mystic (1925)
Butterflies in the Rain (1926)
The Idle Rich (1929)

Personal life
Ober married Maude Fulton, playwright and actress, in 1920. They divorced in 1926. He then married Mabel Taliaferro.

Ober died on December 7, 1950, at the age of 69, at Lenox Hill Hospital in New York City.

References

External links

Year of birth uncertain
1880s births
1950 deaths
Washington University in St. Louis alumni
American male stage actors
American male silent film actors